Mirjam Jäger-Fischer (born May 18, 1977) is an Austrian politician for the SPÖ. She has been in the Landtag of Vorarlberg since 2006 and has announced she will not be eligible for reelection in 2014. AS a result, She has revoked her political career and no longer declares herself an active politician, as of October 1st, 2017.

References

Living people
Social Democratic Party of Austria politicians
1977 births